Waseem Badami is a Pakistani television host and news anchor who currently hosts a political talk show 11th Hour on ARY News.

Early life and education

Waseem was born in Karachi, Pakistan on 7 February 1985. He graduated with MBA degree in Marketing from Shaheed Zulfiqar Ali Bhutto Institute of Science and Technology.

Career

Badami started his career by giving traffic updates on radio during that he was studying at SZABIST. After that he joined Business Plus channel as a researcher. Later his sheer hard work gave him reward and out of thousands of people he got selected for ARY News in 2006 and there he started his career as a journalist and an anchor person. Later, he left the channel in October 2014 and subsequently joined BOL Network as an Executive Vice President and Senior Anchorperson. In April 2015, he resigned from BOL Network and rejoined ARY News. He is currently hosting the popular talk show "11th Hour" on ARY News He also hosts Shan-e-Ramazan on ARY Digital. He is famous for his “Masoomana Sawal” which has become his identity. He also hosts a cricket-related show Har Lamha Purjosh mainly during Pakistan Super League. 
In 2017, Badami partnered up with Hemani Herbals and launched organic products and skin care brand named "WB" after his initials. The product was launched in Dubai followed by Karachi.

In 2022, Waseem started his podcast show on YouTube, "Podcast with Waseem Badami".

Awards

In 2016, he was awarded "Favorite Current Affairs Anchor – Male" award by Agahi Award.

In 2018, his brand WB by Hemani got "Emerging brand of the year" award.

In 2019, he won the 10th Pakistan Achievement Award for the “Best Ramadan Transmission Host”.

References

External links 
•  

Living people
Pakistani television talk show hosts
ARY News newsreaders and journalists
BOL Network people
Pakistani male journalists
1985 births